Diego Natale Bona (11 December 1926 – 29 April 2017) was a Catholic bishop.

Ordained to the priesthood in 1950, Bona served as bishop of the Diocese of Porto-Santa Rufina, Italy from 1985 to 1994. He then served as bishop of the Diocese of Saluzzo from 1994 to 2003.

Notes

1926 births
2017 deaths
21st-century Italian Roman Catholic bishops
20th-century Italian Roman Catholic bishops